Mystic Pinball is the twenty-first solo studio album by American musician John Hiatt. It was released on September 25, 2012 via New West Records. Recording sessions took place at Ben's Studio in Nashville. Production was handled by Kevin Shirley. It features contributions from Doug Henthorn, Brandon Young, Doug Lancio, Russ Pahl, Patrick O'Hearn, Kenneth Blevins, Arlan Schierbaum and Ron Dziubla.

In the United States, the album peaked at No. 39 on the Billboard 200, No. 6 on the Americana/Folk Albums, No. 17 on the Top Rock Albums, No. 8 on the Independent Albums and No. 15 on the Tastemakers. It also reached No. 35 on the Sverigetopplistan, No. 41 on the Dutch Album Top 100, and No. 90 on the Swiss Hitparade.

Critical reception

Mystic Pinball was met with generally favorable reviews from music critics. At Metacritic, which assigns a normalized rating out of 100 to reviews from mainstream publications, the album received an average score of 72, based on five reviews.

Andrew Mueller of Uncut called the work "another assemblage of breezy balladry and snarling storytelling, delivered in the familiar Cookie Monster drawl". AllMusic's Mark Deming wrote: "for a guy whose 40th year as a solo artist is appearing on the horizon, he's sounding as full of ideas and energy as a guy half his age, and Mystic Pinball confirms he's still delivering the goods in an impressive fashion". In his mixed review for PopMatters, Matt Arado stated: "an album that offers familiar pleasures without stretching for new ones".

Track listing

Personnel
 John Hiatt – songwriter, vocals, electric guitar (tracks: 1-3, 5, 8, 9), acoustic guitar (tracks: 4, 6-8, 10-12), organ (track 4), piano (track 6)
 Doug Henthorn – backing vocals (tracks: 1-3, 8), harmony vocals (tracks: 7, 11)
 Brandon Young – backing vocals (track 4)
 Doug Lancio – electric guitar (tracks: 1-9, 11, 12), Hammertone twelve-string guitar (tracks: 7, 10), mandolin & dobro (track 12)
 Russ Pahl – pedal steel guitar (track 11)
 Patrick O'Hearn – bass (tracks: 1-9, 11, 12), fiddle (track 10)
 Kenneth Blevins – drums, percussion (tracks: 1-9, 11, 12)
 Arlan Schierbaum – piano (tracks: 3, 11), organ (track 3)
 Ron Dziubla – saxophone
 Kevin Shirley – recording, mixing, producer
 Jared Kvitka – engineering
 Leslie Richter – engineering
 Pat Thrall – additional engineering
 Bob Ludwig – mastering
 John Golden – additional mastering
 Gina R. Binkley – design
 Jack Spencer – photography
 Gary Briggs – A&R

Charts

References

External links

2012 albums
John Hiatt albums
New West Records albums
Albums produced by Kevin Shirley